The yellow-breasted pipit (Anthus chloris) is a species of bird in the pipit and wagtail family Motacillidae.
It is found in Lesotho and South Africa.
Its natural habitats are subtropical or tropical high-altitude grassland, arable land, and pastureland.
It is threatened by habitat loss.

References

External links
Image at ADW

 Yellow-breasted pipit  - Species text in The Atlas of Southern African Birds.

yellow-breasted pipit
Birds of Southern Africa
yellow-breasted pipit
Taxonomy articles created by Polbot
Taxobox binomials not recognized by IUCN